"Walk It Out" is the debut single of rapper Unk from his debut album Beat'n Down Yo Block! The song was played on the radio in Atlanta starting in March 2006 but did not gain popularity nationwide until September of that year. The song peaked at number 10 on the Billboard Hot 100, giving him the first top-ten single of his career.

The song was written by Montay Humphrey, Anthony Platt and Howard Simmons. The official remix has been lengthened to include four verses, featuring Outkast, Unk himself, and Jim Jones.

The song was performed at the 1st Annual BET Hip Hop Awards in 2006.

Charts

Weekly charts

Year-end charts

References 

Crunk songs

External links
 'Walk it out" (Lyric Video) on YouTube

2006 debut singles
Unk songs
2006 songs
Hip hop dance
MNRK Music Group singles